Roger Goodman may refer to:

Roger Goodman, American politician
Roger Goodman (director), TV director
Roger Goodman (academic), Warden of St Antony's College, Oxford